Heide may refer to:
Places
Heide, a town in Schleswig-Holstein, Germany
Heide Park, a theme park in Lower Saxony, Germany
Heide–Büsum Airport in Germany
Heide, Venray, a village in the southeast of the Netherlands
Heide, Kalmthout, a village in northern Belgium
The Heide Museum of Modern Art in Bulleen, Victoria, Australia
Huis ter Heide (disambiguation) – several objects

Other
Heide (name), list of notable people with this name
Heide Candy Company
Heide Circle, grouping of Australian artists

See also
Heidi (disambiguation)